The Athlone Institute of Technology (AIT) was an institute of technology, located in Athlone, Ireland. Established in 1970, the institute's campus was located on University Road.

A consortium between itself and the Limerick Institute of Technology was announced with the intention of forming a technological university. On 23 November 2020, the AIT-LIT Consortium announced that the joint Limerick-Athlone IT application for technological university (TU) status had been submitted for approval, which was granted in May 2021.

On 16 July 2021, the institute of technology was officially dissolved and succeeded by the Technological University of the Shannon: Midlands Midwest, which began operations on 1 October 2021.

History 
The Athlone Institute of Technology (AIT) was established by the Irish Government in 1970 as the Athlone Regional Technical College, under control of the local Vocational Education Committee. The college gained more autonomy with the enactment of the Regional Technical Colleges Act 1992. In late 1997, as with the other RTC's, it was renamed as the Athlone Institute of Technology (AIT). In 1999, AIT became a validation authority with the power to award HETAC degrees.

In 2000, Ciarán Ó Catháin was appointed as the institute's president. Dr. David Fenton and James Coyle were previous holders of the post, having been called director and principal. In 2001, a School of Humanities was opened. In 2010, then-president of Ireland Mary McAleese spoke at the fortieth anniversary of the college.

The AIT had a campus size of 44 acres, and new, purpose-built facilities that included the Hospitality, Tourism and Leisure Studies building, built in 2003; the Nursing and Health Science building and the Midlands Innovation and Research Centre, built in 2005; as well as the Engineering and Informatics building and the Postgraduate Research Hub, built in 2010. RTÉ's Midlands studio and office have been located at the institute.

The institute had a memorandum of understanding with the Rio de Janeiro State University, one of the largest universities in the Brazilian city. It also had agreements with the Pontifical Catholic University of Minas Gerais, one of the largest Brazilian private universities. The institute also founded agreements with two leading Beijing universities, the Capital University of Economics and Business and the Beijing Union University. The agreements were signed by the Chinese Ambassador to Ireland and university representatives. Other agreements existed between the institute and TVTC, in Saudi Arabia, and a memorandum of understanding existed with the Georgia Institute of Technology. Further agreements existed with the Bharati Vidyapeeth, one of the largest universities in India.

College of sanctuary 
In 2017, AIT became the first designated college of sanctuary in Ireland.

AIT-LIT Consortium and dissolution 
In 2018, the institute had investigated the possibility of becoming a university in its own right. A consortium between itself and the Limerick Institute of Technology was announced in October 2019 with the intention of forming a technological university. On 23 November 2020, the AIT-LIT Consortium announced that the joint Limerick-Athlone IT application for technological university (TU) status had been submitted for approval. Approval was announced in May 2021 by minister of Higher Education, Simon Harris.

On 16 July 2021, both itself and the Limerick Institute of Technology were officially dissolved through a signed order by the minister. The institute was succeeded by the Technological University of the Shannon: Midlands Midwest, which began operations on 1 October 2021.

Facilities 
 The Goldsmith Library, named after Oliver Goldsmith, novelist, playwright and poet
 McCormack Hall, performance venue named after John McCormack, tenor

AIT International Arena 

An international athletics arena with an overall building floor area of 9,715 m2 was opened in early 2013. The arena can house 2,000 spectators and was constructed at a cost of €10 million.

Notable alumni

See also 
 Education in the Republic of Ireland
 List of higher education institutions in the Republic of Ireland

References

External links 
 

Buildings and structures in Athlone
Educational institutions established in 1970
Institute of Technology, Athlone
Universities and colleges in the Republic of Ireland
Institutes of technology in the Republic of Ireland
1970 establishments in Ireland
Technological University of the Shannon: Midlands Midwest
Educational institutions disestablished in 2021
2021 disestablishments in Ireland